Superchi is a surname. Notable people with the surname include:

Antonio Superchi (1816–1893), Italian operatic baritone
Franco Superchi (born 1944), Italian footballer